Harrow International School Bangkok is a British international school in Don Mueang District, Bangkok, Thailand.

It was established and gained its license to operate in Thailand in 1998 in association with Harrow School, a boarding school for boys in London, United Kingdom. The school has over 1600 students, both boys and girls, ranging in age from 18 months to 18 years, representing 36 different nationalities. The school is divided into two day schools, upper and lower, and bases its education on the English National Curriculum. Harrow Bangkok specialises in boarding provision for students from Year 5 upwards. The majority of teaching staff are recruited from the United Kingdom and Ireland. The current headmaster, Jonathan Standen, joined the school in 2019.

As of 2019, yearly tuition fees ranged from 448,900 baht for half-day, pre-nursery students to 934,900 baht for Year 12-13 students. Full boarding for newly enrolled students is 499,000 baht per year.

Alumni 
James Assaraskorn, (James Ma), Actor and model

Pattarasaya Yongrattanamongkol (Mint), Actress and model

Paravisa Phanjati (Whan), Actress

Temfah Krisanayuth (Pan Pan), Actress, model, dancer and singer

Patpaiboon Opassuwan (Jet), Member of Atlas

Norawit Titicharoenrak (Gemini), Actor and singer

History  
Harrow International School was founded in 1998 and first operated as a language school at Riverine Place Condo. The first headmaster was Mr Stuart Morris, who had previously been headmaster of a school in Malaysia. Mr Morris oversaw a period of growth as the school's enrolment rose to over 700 students in 2002.
 
Dr J Mark Hensman, previously a headmaster in his native New Zealand, took over as headmaster and oversaw the school's relocation to a purpose-built campus at Don Mueang, near Don Mueang Airport, in 2003. The new 35-acre campus included new facilities, sports fields and boarding houses, and allowed the school enrolment to increase to 1,160. During his tenure, the iconic boater and the House system were introduced, strengthening ties to the original Harrow School.

Beginning in 2013, Michael Farley, Head Master between 2012 and 2018, launched a 5-year redevelopment programme.

Affiliations 
Harrow Bangkok is operated by a private company, Harrow Asia Limited. Harrow Asia Limited also oversees Harrow International Schools in Beijing, Hong Kong and Shanghai.

All Harrow International Schools are operated under a license granted by Harrow School in London. Close ties exist within the Harrow family, with teacher and student exchanges, interviews for the international schools being held at Harrow School, and day-to-day co-operation between staff and management across the network. Two governors from Harrow School London are on the board of governors of Harrow International Schools and they regularly visit the schools.

In 2006 Harrow International School gained accreditation from the Council of International Schools (CIS). Harrow Bangkok is also a member of the Federation of British International Schools in Asia (FOBISIA); South East Asia Student Activities Conference (SEASAC) and the International Schools Association of Thailand (ISAT).

Student body 
As of 2019 there are 1664 students, 80 percent Thai and 20 percent British, Chinese and other nationalities. As of 2019 140 students board at the school.

See also 

 Harrow School, in the UK
 Harrow International School Hong Kong, in Hong Kong
 Harrow International School Beijing, in China
Harrow International School Shanghai, in China

References

External links
 Harrow International School Bangkok web site
Harrow International School Bangkok Alumni

Educational institutions established in 1998
International schools in Bangkok
British international schools in Thailand
1998 establishments in Thailand
Boarding schools in Thailand
Private schools in Thailand